Quackodile Tears is a 1962 Warner Bros. Merrie Melodies cartoon directed by Art Davis, during his spare time while working at Hanna-Barbera. The short was released on March 31, 1962, and stars Daffy Duck.

Plot
Honeybunch is sitting on an egg in her nest and knitting. She tells Daffy it's his turn to sit, but he refuses until she kicks his butt. He moves the egg for a moment to fluff up the nest, but the egg rolls away down the hill and into another nest full of eggs. Unbeknownst to him, these are alligator eggs. Unable to tell the difference, Daffy picks an egg at random and brings it back to his nest. The mother alligator sees him take an egg and cries out, and the father alligator chases Daffy. They squabble about the egg back and forth for a while until Honeybunch returns.

At one point, Daffy uses a grenade painted white as a trap for the crocodile. Honeybunch mistakes it as Daffy throwing away their egg, so she strangles Daffy and forces him to sit on that "egg", ignoring Daffy's explanation that it is a grenade, not the real egg. It explodes, setting his tail on fire.

She makes him sit on the real egg until it hatches into a baby alligator. And when Daffy starts clobbering the alligator with a bat, she tells her husband it's just an ugly duckling which will grow into a beautiful swan. Meanwhile, Mrs. Alligator tells her husband something similar, since both families had swapped eggs.

References

External links 

 
 
 Quackodile Tears on Dailymotion

1962 animated films
1962 films
Films directed by Arthur Davis
Merrie Melodies short films
Warner Bros. Cartoons animated short films
Daffy Duck films
Animated films about crocodilians
1962 short films
Films scored by Milt Franklyn
1960s Warner Bros. animated short films
1960s English-language films